George Gibb (1891 – 7 June 1917) was a Scottish professional footballer who played in the Scottish League for Third Lanark as a left half.

Personal life 
Gibb was serving as an acting lance sergeant in the 1st/9th (Glasgow Highlanders) Battalion of the Highland Light Infantry during the First World War when he died of wounds on 7 June 1917. He was buried in Étaples Military Cemetery.

References 

Scottish footballers
1917 deaths
Military personnel from Lanarkshire
British Army personnel of World War I
British military personnel killed in World War I
1891 births
Glasgow Highlanders soldiers
Scottish Football League players
Cambuslang Rangers F.C. players
Third Lanark A.C. players
Sportspeople from Wishaw
Association football wing halves
Association football fullbacks
Burials at Étaples Military Cemetery
Scottish Junior Football Association players
Footballers from North Lanarkshire